The 2011 Big South men's soccer tournament is the 2011 edition of the tournament, which determines the men's college soccer champion of the Big South Conference, as well as the conference's automatic berth into the 2011 NCAA Division I Men's Soccer Championship. The tournament will begin on November 10 and conclude on November 13.

Qualification

Bracket

Schedule

Quarterfinals 
The home team, or higher seed, is listed on the left, the away team is listed on the right.

Semifinals

Championship

See also 
 Big South Conference
 2011 Big South men's soccer season
 2011 in American soccer
 2011 NCAA Division I Men's Soccer Championship
 2011 NCAA Division I men's soccer season

References

External links
 Big South Conference Tournament Central

Tournament
Big South Conference Men's Soccer Tournament
Big South Conference Men's Soccer Tournament